Ismaël Koudou (born 27 September 1975) is a Burkinabé former professional footballer who played as a forward.

Club career
Koudou began his career with ASFA Yennega, He joined WA Tlemcen on loan in summer 2002. In the Algerian Championnat National he played 55 games who scored seven goals before returning to his homeclub ASFA Yennega in 2004. After a half year he was again loaned out to Kuwaiti Division One club Khaitan but returned to ASFA Yennega in January 2006. After his return he played one year with the club and then signed for a second time in Kuwait for Al-Jahra in June 2007.

International career
Koudou was part of the Burkina Faso national team's squad at the 1998 African Nations Cup in his home country, as well as the national squad that participated in the 2000 African Cup of Nations held in Nigeria and Ghana.

References

External links
 

1975 births
Living people
Sportspeople from Ouagadougou
Burkinabé footballers
Association football forwards
Burkina Faso international footballers
1998 African Cup of Nations players
2000 African Cup of Nations players
Kuwait Premier League players
ASFA Yennenga players
WA Tlemcen players
Al Jahra SC players
Khaitan SC players
Burkinabé football managers
Burkinabé expatriate footballers
Burkinabé expatriate sportspeople in Algeria
Expatriate footballers in Algeria
Burkinabé expatriate sportspeople in Kuwait
Expatriate footballers in Kuwait
21st-century Burkinabé people